Black Butte is the summit of a small range of hills on the northwest edge of Mesquite Valley and the southern end of the Pahrump Valley in Clark County, Nevada.

References

Mountains of Clark County, Nevada
Mountains of Nevada